Rolfe's Chop House is a Manhattan eating establishment located at 90 Fulton Street, established in 1848. In February 1924 the store and basement of a Fulton Street edifice were sold to Mary Drake and her son. Following extensive improvements, the restaurant was opened as Rolfe's Chop House. 
Located in the Financial District, Rolfe's Chop House is memorable to the history of New York City.

Earlier, the eatery was located in the Drake Building, 42 John Street. Thomas C. Innd (died October 13, 1914), a member of the Irish Historical Society and a New York City native, 
was proprietor at the John Street location.

Melville "Ernest" Fox (Feb 13, 1898 - Oct 1981) was proprietor in the mid 1930s until Rolfe's close in 1967–68. During his tenure he was known for the “Ernest Special Salads” (“Made to order at the table”), which allowed Fox to foster relationships with the restaurant's noted clientele.

Among the beverages served by the restaurant, in the mid-1930s, included Sandy MacDonald scotch whiskey. The New York City Guide, published by the Works Progress Administration in 1939, notes that lunch at Rolfe's Chop House cost 35 cents and dinner sold for 75 cents. A menu from around 1941 shows dinner from 60 to 85 cents, cocktails, long drinks and liquors from 30 to 75 cents.

References

1848 establishments in New York (state)
Financial District, Manhattan
History of Manhattan
Cultural history of New York City
Restaurants established in 1848
Restaurants in Manhattan